Martin Millar is a Scottish writer from Glasgow, now resident in London. He also writes the Thraxas series of fantasy novels under the pseudonym Martin Scott.

The novels he writes as Martin Millar dwell on urban decay and British sub-cultures, and the impact these have on a range of characters, both realistic and supernatural.  There are elements of magical realism, and the feeling that the boundary between real life and the supernatural is not very thick. Some of them are set in Brixton, Millar's one-time place of residence; many are at least semi-autobiographical, and Love and Peace with Melody Paradise and Suzy, Led Zeppelin and Me both feature Millar himself as a character.

As Martin Scott, his Thraxas novels are a fusion of traditional high fantasy and pulp noir thrillers.

In 2000, he won the World Fantasy Award for best novel with his book Thraxas.

Bibliography

Novels
Milk, Sulphate and Alby Starvation 1987 
Lux the Poet 1988 
Ruby & The Stone Age Diet 1989 
The Good Fairies of New York 1992 
Dreams of Sex and Stage Diving 1994 
Love and Peace with Melody Paradise 1998 
Suzy, Led Zeppelin and Me 2002 
Lonely Werewolf Girl 2007 
Curse of the Wolf Girl 2010  (US)  (UK) originally titled Queen Vex 
The Anxiety of Kalix the Werewolf 2013  
The Goddess of Buttercups and Daisies 2015 
Kink Me Honey 2016 
Supercute Futures 2018 
Simulation Bleed 2020 
Supercute Second Future 2022

Collections
The Collected Martin Millar 1998 
Contains Lux the Poet, Ruby and the Stone Age Diet and The Good Fairies of New York.

Graphic novels
Lux and Alby Sign on and Save the Universe  (with Simon Fraser) 1999

Novelisation for film
Tank Girl 1994

Dramatisation
Emma based on Emma by Jane Austen (with Doon MacKichan) 2001

Short stories included in
Disco Biscuits
Disco 2000

Novels under the name Martin Scott
Thraxas (winner of the 2000 World Fantasy Award)
Thraxas and the Warrior Monks
Thraxas at the Races
Thraxas and the Elvish Isles
Thraxas and the Sorcerers
Thraxas and the Dance of Death
Thraxas at War
Thraxas Under Siege
Thraxas and the Ice Dragon
Thraxas and the Oracle
Thraxas of Turai 
Thraxas meets his Enemies

References

External links
Author's website
Author's blog
2002 interview with the author

1959 births
Living people
Scottish novelists
World Fantasy Award-winning writers
Writers from Glasgow
Scottish male novelists